The Galapagos garden eel (Heteroconger klausewitzi) is an eel in the family Congridae (conger/garden eels). It was described by Irenäus Eibl-Eibesfeldt and Friedmann Köster in 1983, originally under the genus Taenioconger. It is a marine, tropical eel which is known from the eastern central and southeastern Pacific Ocean, including Colombia, Costa Rica, the Galapagos Islands in Ecuador, and Panama.

Etymology
The fish is named in honor of German ichthyologist Wolfgang Klausewitz, who visited the Galápagos Islands where this eel occurs, with the senior author in the 1950s.

More on the eel
The diet of the Galapagos garden eel consists of zooplankton. Due to its widespread distribution in the eastern Pacific, lack of major threats, and lack of observed population decline, the IUCN redlist currently lists the species as Least Concern.

References

External links
 

Heteroconger
Galápagos Islands coastal fauna
Taxa named by Irenäus Eibl-Eibesfeldt
Taxa named by Friedmann Köster
Fish described in 1983